Trombone Panorama is an album by American jazz trombonist Kai Winding featuring performances recorded in late 1956 and early 1957 for the Columbia label.

Reception

The Allmusic awarded the album 3 stars and stated "Trombone Panorama was the first of several albums Kai Winding was to cut during the mid-'50s and early 1960s where he was joined by a shifting cast of fellow trombone players... The flowing seamless technique employed by these top slide-instrument artists resulted in a graceful, mellifluous sound that gave these recordings a chamber jazz feel".

Track listing
 "Trombone Panorama: Fanfare/Lassus Trombone/Muskrat Ramble/I Gotta Right to Sing the Blues/The Sidewalks of New York/Margie/I'm Getting Sentimental Over You/Kaye's Melody/Moonlight Serenade/Bijou/Collaboration/It's All Right with Me/Potpourri" (Kai Winding/Henry Fillmore/Kid Ory/Harold Arlen, Ted Koehler/Charles B. Lawlor, James W. Blake/Con Conrad, J. Russel Robinson, Benny Davis/George Bassman, Ned Washington/Sammy Kaye/Glenn Miller, Mitchell Parish/Ralph Burns/Pete Rugolo, Stan Kenton/Cole Porter/Winding) - 16:44
 "The Party's Over" (Jule Styne, Betty Comden, Adolph Green) - 3:33
 "The Preacher" (Horace Silver) - 3:23
 "Come Rain or Come Shine" (Harold Arlen, Johnny Mercer) - 3:29
 "When the Red, Red Robin (Comes Bob, Bob, Bobbin' Along)" (Harry M. Woods) - 3:11
 "I Can't Give You Anything But Love" (Jimmy McHugh, Dorothy Fields) - 3:13
 "Frankie and Johnny" (Traditional) - 6:59

Personnel
Kai Winding – trombone, narration
Wayne Andre, Carl Fontana – trombone
Dick Leib - bass trombone
Roy Frazee – piano
Kenny O'Brien – bass
Jack Franklin, Tom Montgomery – drums

References

Columbia Records albums
Kai Winding albums
1957 albums
Albums produced by George Avakian